Live at La Paloma is a live album by the hard rock band Spirit. Eleven of the 16 tracks were recorded on October 16, 1993 at the La Paloma Theater in Encinitas, California.

Track listing 
All songs written by Randy California except noted.

Personnel

Spirit 
Randy California- Guitar, Vocals
Ed Cassidy - Drums, Vocals
Larry Knight - Bass
Steve Loria - Bass, Digital Editing
Scott Monahan - Bass, Keyboards, Vocals, Key Bass

Guest Appearance:
John Locke - Piano

References 

Spirit (band) albums
1995 live albums